Francisco Cruz Saubidet Birkner (born 5 October 1998) is an Argentine sport sailor. He competed in the 2020 Summer Olympics. His brother Bautista Saubidet Birkner is also an Olympic Athlete. He is the son of Magdalena Birkner.

Notes

References

External links
 
 
  (2013)
  (2021)
  (2022)
 
 

1998 births
Living people
Argentine male sailors (sport)
Olympic sailors of Argentina
Sailors at the 2020 Summer Olympics – RS:X
Youth Olympic gold medalists for Argentina
Sailors at the 2014 Summer Youth Olympics
Sportspeople from Buenos Aires
21st-century Argentine people
Argentine windsurfers